Derrick Wimbush (born August 26, 1980) is a former fullback who most recently played for the Georgia Firebirds of the National Arena League (NAL). He attended Fort Valley State University located in Fort Valley, Georgia. Wimbush finished his senior season at Fort Valley State with 1,840 rushing yards and 22 touchdowns and his career in the Division II Southern Intercollegiate Athletic Conference with 3,188 rushing yards. Wimbush was runner up for the 2004 Harlon Hill Trophy given to NCAA Division II’s best player. During his brief career with the Jacksonville Jaguars, Wimbush rarely carried the ball, however his blocking, and his play on special teams has contributed to a highly skilled, rushing attack from the Jaguars. In 2016, Wimbush signed with the Georgia Firebirds of American Indoor Football (AIF).

References

1980 births
Living people
American football running backs
Fort Valley State Wildcats football players
Jacksonville Jaguars players
Albany Panthers players
Georgia Fire players
Georgia Firebirds players
People from Taylor County, Georgia
Players of American football from Georgia (U.S. state)
People from Americus, Georgia